Bossier may refer to:

 Bossier City, Louisiana
 Bossier Parish, Louisiana
 Pierre Bossier, French explorer for whom Bossier City and Parish are named